Letcher is an unincorporated community in Letcher County, Kentucky. It is served by a post office that is assigned zip code 41832.

References

Unincorporated communities in Kentucky
Unincorporated communities in Letcher County, Kentucky